Liam Steven Gibson (born 25 April 1997) is an English professional footballer who plays as a left back for Morecambe.

Career
Born in Stanley, Gibson began his career with Newcastle United, spending a short time on loan with Gateshead in 2015. He missed the entire 2017–18 season due to ill health, after suffering from ulcerative colitis.

He moved on loan to Accrington Stanley in January 2019, and on loan to Grimsby Town in July 2019.

He was released by Newcastle at the end of the 2019–20 season. In September 2020 he signed for Morecambe. He was offered a new contract by the club in June 2021, and signed a two-year deal later that month.

Personal life
Gibson's younger brother Lewis is also a professional footballer and currently plays for Everton.

Career statistics

References

1997 births
Living people
English footballers
Newcastle United F.C. players
Gateshead F.C. players
Accrington Stanley F.C. players
Grimsby Town F.C. players
Morecambe F.C. players
English Football League players
Association football fullbacks